Anthony Langley Swymmer (1724–1760) was an 18th-century English MP. He sat for Southampton from 1747 to 1754.

Swymmer was born and died in Jamaica. He was the only son of Anthony Swymmer of St. Thomas-in-the-East. He was educated at Winchester and Peterhouse. He married Arabella, daughter of Sir John Astley, 2nd Baronet.

References

Jamaican people of English descent
Alumni of Peterhouse, Cambridge
People educated at Winchester College
British MPs 1747–1754
1724 births
1760 deaths